Saúde is a municipality in the state of Bahia in the North-East region of Brazil. Its population estimated in 2020 is 12,943.

See also
List of municipalities in Bahia

References

External links

Municipalities in Bahia